El Rojo Norte is a cinder cone in the Andes, constructed on top of volcano debris in the Lauca basin.

Its profile has been reduced by erosion; the cone sits on an andesitic mound. A lava flow containing mafic andesite is associated with the cone. Phreatomagmatic deposits are also found.

The cone is formed by reddish scoria. Its rocks are basaltic andesite. It was erupted 3.1 ± 0.2 million years ago on the basis of potassium-argon dating. Other dates are 3.05 ± 0.22, 3.35 ± 0.16 and 2.34 ± 0.16 mya. Which age is correct is unclear, but the cone is partly buried by the 2.72 mya old Lauca-Pérez ignimbrite indicating that it's older than this ignimbrite.

References 

Pliocene volcanism
Monogenetic volcanoes
Volcanoes of Arica y Parinacota Region
Cinder cones of Chile